Motz is a surname. Notable people with the name include:

 Anna Motz (born 1964), consultant clinical and forensic psychologist 
 Diana Gribbon Motz (born 1943), United States Circuit Judge 
 Dick Motz (1940–2007), New Zealand cricketer
 Frank Motz (1869–1944), American baseball player
 Glen Motz (born 1958), Canadian politician 
 Hans Motz (1909–87), Austrian-born physicist in the United Kingdom
 J. Frederick Motz (born 1942), senior United States District Judge
 Lloyd Motz (1909–2004), American astronomer
 Lotte Motz (1922–1997), Austrian-American scholar
 Roger Motz (1904–64), Belgian politician
 Walter Motz, German cross country skier of the 1930s
 Wilhelm Amsinck Burchard-Motz (1878–1963), German lawyer and politician

See also
Metz (surname)